State of Play were a series of six conferences held from 2003 to 2009 and sponsored by the Institute for Information Law & Policy at New York Law School and the Information Society Project at Yale Law School, which dealt with the intersection of virtual worlds, games and the law.

Conference 1: Law, Games, and Virtual Worlds (November 13-15, 2003)
This interdisciplinary conference was the first effort to understand the phenomenon of digital games and the virtual worlds they create, creating a discussion about the complex social, psychological, and legal issues to which they give rise.

Conference 2: Reloaded (October 28-30, 2004)
The second conference highlighted two themes: the role of intellectual property and governance in virtual worlds. Should we import copyright and trademark into virtual spaces? Can we exclude them? What should be the relationship between real and virtual world economies? Should legislatures protect virtual world property? What are the possibilities for using virtual spaces to practice the activities of real world democracy? Should virtual worlds be treated as separate jurisdictions with their own evolving norms and forms of dispute resolution? What is the potential for using virtual worlds to promote democracy and self-governance?

Conference 3: Social Revolutions (October 6-8, 2005)
The third conference focused on social relationships in the metaverse and how to build vibrant, flourishing, creative places.

Conference 4: The Terra Nova Symposium (December 1-2, 2006)
The fourth conference was an intentionally smaller event intended to engage in the serious study of virtual worlds by getting researchers to inquire into the nature of research into these worlds. The conference gathered researchers, scholars and thinkers together to ask how virtual worlds should be studied, as well as what are the most fruitful lines of research, the most interesting substantive developments, and the most fascinating voices from whom we should be hearing? This conference was capped at 60 participants and was put on in conjunction with Terra Nova, the blog about the serious study of virtual worlds.

Conference 5: Building the Global Metaverse (August 19-August 22, 2007)
While the previous conferences had been held at New York Law School, this event was held in Singapore and was organised jointly by Harvard Law School, Yale Law School, New York Law School, Trinity University, and Nanyang Technological University in Singapore. The conference discussed the future of cyberspace and the impact of these new immersive, social online environments on education, law, politics and society. The hallmark of the conference was a multi-disciplinary perspective on emergent virtual realms capable of seamlessly supporting communication, commerce and interaction across national and continental boundaries.

Conference 6 (June 19-20, 2009)
The final conference, held in New York, examined the past, present and future of virtual worlds, focusing on the rise of virtual worlds and multiplayer online games, and asked whether these worlds had reached a plateau in their development. The conference also discussed whether professionals and academia have reached a limit in their understanding of these worlds, and whether there were useful research questions still left to pursue.

Book
In 2006, NYU Press released The State of Play: Law, Games and Virtual Worlds, a collection of essays on virtual worlds and the law, based on the first conferences.

References

External links
 State of Play - Archives 
 State of Play (2006) on Amazon

Conferences in the United States
Gaming
Legal conferences